Liam Davis (born 8 November 1990) is an English semi-professional footballer. He last played for Cleethorpes Town.

Davis started his career in the Youth teams of home town club Grimsby Town, where he failed to break into the first team. After departing Grimsby Town, Liam went onto play for Selby Town, Brigg Town, Gainsborough Trinity, and most recently Cleethorpes Town, who he represented in the 2017 FA Vase Final at Wembley.

Early life 
Davis attended Toll Bar Business & Enterprise College in Grimsby.

Club career

Armthorpe Welfare 
After being released from Grimsby Town, Davis joined Armthorpe Welfare.

Selby Town 
After a single season at Armthorpe, Davis joined Northern Counties East Premier Division side Selby Town.

Barton Town Old Boys 
Ahead of the 2011–12 season, Davis joined fellow Northern Counties East Premier Division side Barton Town Old Boys.

Brigg Town 
Davis signed for Brigg Town of the Northern Premier League First Division South. Davis was named Brigg's Player of the Season in the 2012–13 season.

Gainsborough Trinity 
Davis joined Gainsborough Trinity on 1 July 2013, who at the time played in the Conference North.

Cleethorpes Town 
On 4 October 2016, Davis joined Cleethorpes Town.

On 21 May 2017, Davis represented Cleethorpes Town in the 2017 FA Vase Final, where Cleethorpes lost 4–0 to South Shields.

In 2018, Davis was invited to take part in the UEFA Equal Game Campaign, which culminated in him playing in a charity match in Lyon, France, sharing the pitch with former international stars Luís Figo and Eric Abidali.

Personal life 
In January 2014, Davis became Britain's highest profile openly gay footballer. On 21 May 2017, he became the first openly gay male footballer to play at Wembley when he turned out for Cleethorpes in the FA Vase Final.

In December 2017 Davis publicly criticised comments made by FA chairman Greg Clarke that "professional players who out themselves as homosexual would be taking a risk".

As of 2022, Davis owns a bar and café in Cleethorpes.

References 

Living people
1990 births
English footballers
Association football forwards
Association football midfielders
British LGBT footballers
English LGBT sportspeople
Gay sportsmen
Cleethorpes Town F.C. players
Barton Town F.C. players